Clionella kraussii is a species of sea snail, a marine gastropod mollusk in the family Clavatulidae.

This species was named after Ferdinand Krauss (1812–1890), author of Krauss (1848), Die südafrikanischen Mollusken, ein Beitrag zur Kenntniss der Mollusken des Kap- und Natallandes und zur geographischen Verbreitung derselben, mit Beschreibung und Abbildung der neuen Arten; Stuttgart, Ebner & Seubert, 1848.

Description
The size of an adult shell varies between 15 mm and 40 mm.

This species is easily recognized by the short subnodulous ribs, which occupy scarcely the lower half of the whorls, the depression round the middle and the raised band above, and the manner of coloration, the purplish-brown maculations being somewhat flexuous in the depression. Its nearest relation is Clionella semicostata (Kiener, 1840).

Distribution
This marine species occurs along False Bay and West Transkei, South Africa; also off Madagascar.

References

 Kilburn, R.N. (1985). "Turridae (Mollusca: Gastropoda) of southern Africa and Mozambique. Part 2. Subfamily Clavatulinae". Annals of the Natal Museum 26(2), 417–470

External links
 
 MNHN: specimen

kraussii
Gastropods described in 1877